Piro may refer to:

People and peoples
Ferdinando Piro, Italian footballer
Hank Piro, American football player
Mashco-Piro, an uncontacted tribe in Peru
Piro people, commonly called Yine, an indigenous people in Peru
Piro people (New Mexico), a former tribe of Puebloans who lived along the Rio Grande River in North America.
Saint Pyr, or Piro, the 6th century founder of the monastery at Caldey Island, near Manorbier, Wales

Other
 Piro (Megatokyo), a character in the webcomic Megatokyo and the artist's online pseudonym
 Piro, Bihar, a town in Bihar, India
 Yine language or Piro language of the Maipurean family in Brazil

See also
 Pirro (disambiguation)

Language and nationality disambiguation pages